Chonan may refer to:

Chōnan, Chiba, a town in Japan
Cheonan, a city in South Korea
Battle of Chonan, a battle in the city during the Korean War
ROKS Cheonan (PCC-772), a South Korean corvette sunk in 2010
Chonan Gang, the Korean stage name of Tsuyoshi Kusanagi, Japanese actor/singer
Ryo Chonan (born 1976), Japanese mixed martial artist
 Chonan languages, Patagonia